Yang Mingxuan (1891 – August 22, 1967) was a Chinese politician who served as a vice chairperson of the Standing Committee of the National People's Congress and the chairman of the China Democratic League.

References 

1891 births
1967 deaths
Chairpersons of the China Democratic League
Vice Chairpersons of the National People's Congress